Shariatabad may refer to:
 Shariatabad, Amol, Mazandaran Province
 Shariatabad, Nowshahr, Mazandaran Province
 Shariatabad, Razavi Khorasan